is a 2012 Japanese television drama series. It premiered on NTV on 14 January 2012, and concluded 23 June 2012, airing 24 episodes.

Cast
 Aya Hirano as Urara Ayabuki
 Rino Sashihara as Maki Mukouda
 Narushi Ikeda as Ryū Okita
 Nako Mizusawa as Reiko Mikawa
 Moe Arai as Ayano Himekawa

References

External links
 

2012 Japanese television series debuts
Nippon TV dramas
Japanese drama television series
Television shows written by Yûichi Fukuda